The Cayman Islands competed in the 2014 Commonwealth Games in Glasgow, Scotland from 23 July – 3 August 2014. A team of 28 athletes in 7 sports is representing the country, the largest team ever being sent by the territory.

Athletics

The athletics team consists of ten athletes.

Men
Track & road events

Field Events

Women
Field events

Key
Note–Ranks given for track events are within the athlete's heat only
Q = Qualified for the next round
q = Qualified for the next round as a fastest loser or, in field events, by position without achieving the qualifying target
NR = National record
N/A = Round not applicable for the event

Boxing

Only one boxer was included in the final squad.

Cycling

Only one cyclist was included in the final squad.

Road
Men

Gymnastics

Only one gymnast was included in the final squad.

Artistic

Individuals

Shooting

Three shooters were included in the final squad.

Men

Squash

Six squash athletes were included in the final squad.

Individual

Doubles

Swimming

Six swimmers were included in the final squad.

Men

Women

References

Nations at the 2014 Commonwealth Games
Cayman Islands at the Commonwealth Games
2014 in Caymanian sport